"Diamond Girl" is a song by American R&B record producer and singer-songwriter Ryan Leslie. Released on December 11, 2007, the song serves as the lead single from his self-titled debut album, Ryan Leslie.

Remixes
The official remix features Craig David and Mims. American hip hop and gangsta rap group G-Unit recorded their own version of the song, titled "Bottom Girl" and featured it on their mixtape Return of the Body Snatchers (Volume 1) (2008). In addition rapper Kanye West recorded a verse and was also released as a remix.

Charts
The single debuted on the U.S. Billboard Bubbling Under R&B/Hip-Hop Singles chart at number 25 (which is equivalent to number 125 on the U.S. Billboard Hot R&B/Hip-Hop Songs chart), and peaked at number 35 on the Billboard Hot R&B/Hip-Hop Songs chart. The song also peaked at number 95 on the U.S. Billboard Hot 100.

Charts positions

External links
 Video of Ryan Leslie on how he made Diamond Girl

2008 singles
2007 debut singles
Music videos directed by Chris Robinson (director)
Ryan Leslie songs
Song recordings produced by Ryan Leslie
Songs written by Ryan Leslie
2007 songs
Universal Music Group singles